Carlos Henrique dos Santos Costa (born 18 February 1992), commonly known as Lula, is a Brazilian footballer who plays for Votuporanguense as a centre back.

Club career
Born in Gurupi, Tocantins, Lula graduated with América Mineiro's youth setup. He made his professional debut on 18 May 2012, coming on as a second-half substitute for Gilberto in a 2–1 away win against Ceará for the Série B championship.

Lula scored his first goal on 24 November, netting the last in a 3–1 home win against Ipatinga. In 2014, however, after failing to appear regularly for Coelho, he moved to fellow league team Boa Esporte.

On 14 January 2015 Lula moved to Série A club Atlético Paranaense, after agreeing to a one-year deal.

References

External links

Lula at playmakerstats.com (English version of ogol.com.br)

1992 births
Living people
Sportspeople from Tocantins
Brazilian footballers
Association football defenders
Campeonato Brasileiro Série B players
Campeonato Brasileiro Série C players
América Futebol Clube (MG) players
Boa Esporte Clube players
Club Athletico Paranaense players
Tupi Football Club players
Guarani Esporte Clube (MG) players
Associação Ferroviária de Esportes players
Villa Nova Atlético Clube players
Moto Club de São Luís players
Botafogo Futebol Clube (PB) players
Clube Atlético Votuporanguense players